Eric Mallet is a Canadian politician, who was elected to the Legislative Assembly of New Brunswick in the 2020 New Brunswick general election. He represents the electoral district of Shippagan-Lamèque-Miscou as a member of the New Brunswick Liberal Association.

References 

New Brunswick Liberal Association MLAs
21st-century Canadian politicians
Year of birth missing (living people)
Living people